Federal Route 151, or Jalan Niyor Chabang, is a major federal road in Langkawi Island, Kedah, Malaysia.

Features

At most sections, the Federal Route 151 was built under the JKR R5 road standard, allowing maximum speed limit of up to 90 km/h.

List of junctions and town

References

Malaysian Federal Roads
Roads in Langkawi